The FH women's football team is the women's football department of the Fimleikafélag Hafnarfjarðar multi-sport club. It is based in Hafnarfjörður, Iceland, and currently plays in the Úrvalsdeild kvenna, the top-tier women's football league in Iceland.

History
FH's women's football team won the first edition of the national championship in 1972. After losing the title to Ármann in 1973, FH won three successive titles in 1974, 1975 and 1976. The club was promoted from the second-tier 1. deild in 2015, and finished sixth in the 2016 Úrvalsdeild.

Current squad

Honours

League
 Úrvalsdeild kvenna
 Winners (4): 1972, 1974, 1975, 1976
 1. deild kvenna
 Winners (1): 2015

References

External links
Official site

Fimleikafélag Hafnarfjarðar
Football clubs in Iceland
Sport in Hafnarfjörður
Women's football clubs in Iceland
Capital Region (Iceland)
Úrvalsdeild Women clubs